Abdul Rahim Hatif (20 May 1926 – 19 August 2013) was a politician in Afghanistan. He served as one of the vice presidents during the last years of the Democratic Republic of Afghanistan. He was born in Kandahar, Afghanistan.

Career
Hatif was one of the Vice Presidents of Mohammed Najibullah since the 1988 elections. He served as the first vice president from July 1991 to April 1992.

Before the first fall of Kabul, he was the acting President of Afghanistan for two weeks in April 1992, after the resignation of President Najibullah, and before the takeover of power by the Jamiat-e Islami.

Later life and death
Hatif went into exile after he was put out of power in 1992. He moved to the Netherlands, where he died on 19 August 2013.

References

1926 births
2013 deaths
20th-century heads of state of Afghanistan
Presidents of Afghanistan
Vice presidents of Afghanistan
People's Democratic Party of Afghanistan politicians
People from Kandahar
Pashtun people
1980s in Afghanistan
1990s in Afghanistan
Afghan expatriates in the Netherlands